Heikant is a hamlet in the municipality of Oosterhout, in the Dutch province of North Brabant. It is located about 3 km southeast of the centre of Oosterhout.

References

Populated places in North Brabant
Oosterhout